Nicolas Mahut and Vasek Pospisil were the defending champions, but Pospisil chose not to participate this year. Mahut played alongside Pierre-Hugues Herbert, but lost in the semifinals to Ivan Dodig and Marcel Granollers.

Dodig and Granollers went on to win the title, defeating Wesley Koolhof and Matwé Middelkoop in the final, 7–6(7–5), 6–3.

Seeds

Draw

Draw

Qualifying

Seeds

Qualifiers
  Tallon Griekspoor /  Niels Lootsma

Qualifying draw

References

External links
 Main draw
 Qualifying draw

Doubles